Peer Khizer Hayat Shah Khagga is a Pakistani politician who was a Member of the Provincial Assembly of the Punjab, from October 2011 to May 2018 and from August 2018 to January 2023.

Early life and education
He was born on 11 October 1984 in Sahiwal.

He graduated in Commerce in 2006 from University of the Punjab. He has the degree of Master of Business Administration.

Political career
He was elected to the Provincial Assembly of the Punjab as a candidate of Pakistan Muslim League (N) (PML-N) from Constituency PP-220 (Sahiwal-I) in by-polls held in October 2011. He received 39,989 votes and defeated Muzaffar Shah Khagga, a joint candidate of Pakistan Muslim League (Q) and Pakistan Peoples Party.

He was re-elected to the Provincial Assembly of the Punjab as a candidate of PML-N from Constituency PP-220 (Sahiwal-I) in 2013 Pakistani general election.

He was re-elected to Provincial Assembly of the Punjab as a candidate of PML-N from Constituency PP-196 (Sahiwal-I) in 2018 Pakistani general election.

References

Living people
Punjab MPAs 2013–2018
Punjab MPAs 2008–2013
1984 births
Pakistan Muslim League (N) MPAs (Punjab)
Punjab MPAs 2018–2023